Allobates conspicuus is a species of frog in the family Aromobatidae. It native to western Brazil and eastern Peru. Its natural habitats are rivers, freshwater marshes, and intermittent freshwater marshes.

References

conspicuus
Amphibians of Brazil
Amphibians of Peru
Taxonomy articles created by Polbot
Amphibians described in 2002